A theater sustainment command is a United States Army logistics headquarters.  The theater sustainment command is the senior army logistics command in a theater. The command is a modular organization tailored to meet specific requirements of the theater.  It will command one or more sustainment commands.

When serving in a joint environment where the army is the dominant service, the TSC could provide core elements of a single, joint logistics command and control capability.

Theater sustainment commands

References

Sustainment Commands of the United States Army